Udayarpalayam division is a revenue division in the Ariyalur district of Tamil Nadu, India.

References 
 

Ariyalur district